San Mateo is a village of the municipality of the Los Corrales de Buelna in the autonomous community of Cantabria, Spain. Situated to the north and its population is 300 people.

History 

The first historical reference document of the people of San Mateo dates back to 978 at the end of the 10th century, when the counts of Castile (Garcia Fernandez "the hands of white" and Aba) founded for her daughter Urraca Covarrubias in infantry being assigned to the then Valley Olna places of San Martin de Lobos, Somahoz of San Andres, San Julian de Barros, St. Cyprian Los Corrales, and so on. Outside his domain was the Village of San Mateo, which belonged to the monastery Cervatos, as recorded in the Calf of Behetrías.

In 1431 was formed County Buelna, King John II of Castile But attributed to Child, collateral descendant of one of the most illustrious lineage of The Mountain: Casa de la Vega. His mother was Agnes Laso de la Vega, loves breeding of heir to the crown of Castile, so that from his childhood was educated at King's house, where he received a careful education, in harmony with military activities. In recognition for his actions against pirates in 1404 and issuing punishment England 1405, was named first holder of this county.

This title went after his nephew, the son of his brother Alfonso Child, abbot of Santillana, who commissioned the construction of the tower fortress erected in his honour at the end of the 14th or early 15th century. In the neighborhood of Llano, constitute at present the most emblematic monument Valley Buelna.

With the extinction of this lineage, took place the lordship of the Marquis de Aguilar and counts of Castaneda, after Dukes of Frias, until the formation of the municipal regime in the early 19th century. In 1822 valley Buelna, one of the Merindad of Asturias Santillana, was divided into two countys: San Felices de Buelna and St. Matthew.

In 1835 municipalities of what drew people to locate in the new Valley area certainly more influential and hitches a greased wire to be the engine of the whole county of Besaya, people of Los Corrales de Buelna which today gives its name to the entire county.

Today St. Matthew is a locality in that town next to Barros Caldas de Besaya COO Somahoz, and Los Corrales de Buelna.

With regard to historical heritage highlights the mansion "The Palace" with weapons of Garcia del Rivero and Gonzalez-Quijano, both of the 18th century.

Geography

Location 

The town is located in the geographic centre of the Cantabria 90 metres above sea level and 1.4 kilometres from the capital city, Los Corrales de Buelna.

It is surrounded to the north by the people of Barros with which it shares Polygon Industrial,  to the south-east by Los Corrales de Buelna and the west by the Nature Reserve of Sakha-Besaya which contains the origin of the River Rebujas.

Population 

In 2004 St. Matthew had a population of 310 inhabitants (INE).

Barrios 

 Emphasize the historical; The Isprón, la Llosa, The Los Palacios Castañera and because since 1753 in Cadastre Ensenada until today there is evidence of them.

These names are added: Pena del Campo, Mies of Arduengo, Schools National Disaster Alley, The Corraliega, Campiza, Monco, Pozona, The Coteruco, Rebujas, fisheries, Calero, La Concepcion and Portillo jarrera.

Mountains 

 The Pujino, Window Rebujas, La Peña of San Mateo, The Return of the cart.

The River Rebujas 

The River Rebujas is born beneath the Brañas of Pojino, its waters run by the Nature Reserve of Sakha and its meanders to divide people into two halves to form an image central to the life of the inhabitants of San Mateo. 
Give name to the slopes of Mount San Mateo prosperous land and water not only for livestock but also for logging.

It is no historical sites as well Braulio or Pozón, where for years served as a recreational area for residents. In the area of Industrial Park belongs to the people, the river goes Rebujas abandoning the town to lead the Besaya.

Unfortunately the situation of neglect mean that both the flora and animal is in a critical situation affecting even the different migratory birds.

Culture 

In St. Matthew festival highlights its music Rebujas Rock, and the different activities under the organization of the SCD REBUJAS.

 Teachings: 
The academic activity is given by the CPREBUJAS and IES Estela de Cantabria latter located in Barrio La Pena del Campo.

Sports and Cultural Society 

The recent People's sociocultural history of San Mateo is linked to birth in 1982, "Pena Rebujas." A non-profit society that was founded with the primary objective of maintaining and revitalizing the Schutzheiligenfest San Mateo.

At the same time sport, culture and traditions of the people will be strengthened since its inception. In the year 2007 celebrated its 25 anniversary.

Today has a consolidated Head office with more than 250 partners and countless sympathizers, a meeting place of all neighbours and where pivoting all the numerous activities carried out by the SCD Rebujas. 
The current directive is formed by: 
'' 'President: Cesar Roiz Revuelta 
 'Vice: Ruben Garcia Portilla 
 'Accountant: Jose Antonio Solar Collantes (the Cat)
'' 'Secretary: Jose Antonio Velez Fernandez  'Area Sports: Alberto Gonzalez del Prado  'Cultural Area: Rafael Rasillo Echave and Axier Sasian Bariazarra

Regional grouping of suits 

Since 2001 St. Matthew costumes are tailored to regional maintain the spirit and tradition of the great diversity of this element in Cantabria. More than 50 suits today are with those who are considered and not just walk in the feasts of the people but by the whole geography of Cantabria due to the strong affinity that people have with the region.

Sports

Bowling

Emphasizes the Bolus palm: Sport vernacular Cantabria in San Mateo has the PB Rebujas-Cagigas Solar as well as a Training School. Its main activities are: Regional Cadet Championship, Championship Base Cagigas-Solar Championship Veterans Memorial "Romualdo Garcia evil" and Social Championship.

Football hall 

The village has received numerous federal and equipment where, despite the few people who have the people, in the year 2004 equipment child was Champion Cantabria and represented the region in the Championship Spain.

Sports facilities 

 Bowling public "People of San Mateo" 
 Sports court "Angel Iglesias Renero Tito" 
 Cover of San Mateo "The Stadium" 
 Velodrome "Jose Antonio Gonzalez Linares"

Festivals

In the week of September 21 they celebrate the festival patron in which all the people involved is showing the union between the neighbors, open character, sympathy and good work in the most eagerly awaited date of the year. Traditional pilgrimage s with major orchestras, pito and drum, folklore of Cantabria In essence and huge tastings sardines s with roasted peppers, among other foods. There are also sports and cultural activities for all ages where originality stresses the "Race Snails." 
 Magosto: In the third Saturday of the month November celebrated the ancient Magosto. In this event together, chestnut s baked, mountain pilgrimage, etc.. 
 March: The last night of the month February, is being held in San Mateo another tradition of great weight in Cantabria. Several neighbors unite to sing the March by the different neighborhoods to wish a good and productive spring. 
 Significantly the music festival that has hotted up today being missed in Cantabria and much of northern Spain, called festival Rebujas rock festival.

External links
 Festival official website REBUJAS ROCK

Towns in Spain
Populated places in Cantabria